Long Shot is a 2017 short documentary film about how Juan Catalan was arrested for a murder he did not commit. A TV show, Curb Your Enthusiasm, contains raw footage that was instrumental in proving his innocence.

The documentary was released on Netflix on September 29, 2017.

Synopsis 
In August 2003 Juan Catalan was arrested for the murder of Martha Puebla in Los Angeles County, California. Puebla had been a witness at his brother's (Mario Catalan) hearing a few days prior which he had attended. Police officers arrested him, as he fit the facial composite a witness described. He was cleared after footage from Curb Your Enthusiasm revealed that he was at a Dodgers game, and a phone call traced him to Dodger Stadium before the murder.

Cast
 Tasha Boggs
 Juan Catalan
 Melissa Catalan
 Miguel Catalan
 Larry David
 Bob Einstein
 Kym Whitley
 Leslie Dunn
 Sam Fernandez
 Eric Gagne
 Robert Gajic
 Tim Gibbons
 Marcus Giles
 Todd Melnik
 Alma Oseguera
 Martin Pinner
 Juan Rodriguez
 Beth Silverman

Release
It was released on September 29, 2017, on Netflix.

References

External links
 
 
 

2017 short documentary films
American short documentary films
Netflix original documentary films
2010s English-language films
2010s American films